The National Council for Transgender Persons (NCTP) is the statutory body of the Government of India, generally concerned with advising the government on all policy matters affecting transgender and intersex persons, as well as people with diverse GIESC (gender identity/expression and sex characteristics) identities. It was established in 2020 under the provisions of the Transgender Persons (Protection of Rights) Act, 2019.

, NCTP is led by the Minister of Social Justice and Empowerment, Thawar Chand Gehlot. The council is composed of four representatives of the transgender community and one from Intersex community, one each from five different regions: the north, south, east, west and northeast. Additionally, several Joint secretary-level ex-officio members from various governmental ministries serve on the council as well as five expert members from nongovernmental organisations.

Key Members

Regional representatives 
Laxmi Narayan Tripathi
Gopi Shankar Madurai
Zainab P Rifai
Shayamchand Kokchitbomb
Meera Parida

Expert members
Reshma Prasad
Aryan Pasha
Vihaan Peethambar
C. Ganeshdas

See also 
 LGBT rights in India
 Transgender Persons (Protection of Rights) Act, 2019
 National Legal Services Authority v. Union of India

Reference 

Transgender rights in India
2020 establishments in India
Government agencies established in 2020
Transgender organizations
National human rights institutions
Modi administration initiatives